XHSAG-FM (92.5 FM)/XESAG-AM (1040 AM) is a radio station in Salamanca, Guanajuato, with studios in Irapuato. Owned by Radiorama but operated by Corporación Bajío Comunicaciones, XESAG carries a grupera format known as Radio Lobo Bajío.

History
The original XESAG concession was awarded to Radio Creatividad, S.A., a Radiorama subsidiary, on November 30, 1994.

XESAG was approved to move to FM in April 2018. The 92.5 frequency had first been offered to XEZH-AM 1260, which opted not to move. The FM was launched in November 2021.

Note

References

Radio stations in Guanajuato